The Federal Statistical System of the United States is the decentralized network of federal agencies which produce data and official statistics about the people, economy, natural resources, and infrastructure of the United States.

Background
In contrast to many other countries, the United States does not have a primary statistical agency. Instead, the statistical system is decentralized, with 13 statistical agencies, two of which are independent agencies and the remaining 11 generally located in different government departments. This structure keeps statistical work in close proximity to the various cabinet-level departments that use the information. In addition, three other statistical units of government agencies are recognized by the OMB as having statistical work as part of their mission. 

As of fiscal year 2013 (FY13), the 13 principal statistical agencies have statistical activities as their core mission and conduct much of the government’s statistical work. A further 89 federal agencies were appropriated at least $500,000 of statistical work in FY11, FY12, or FY13 in conjunction with their primary missions. All together, the total budget allocated to the Federal Statistical System is estimated to be $6.7 billion for FY13.

The Federal Statistical System is coordinated through the Office of Management and Budget (OMB). OMB establishes and enforces statistical policies and standards, ensures that resources are proposed for priority statistical programs, and approves statistical surveys conducted by the Federal government under the Paperwork Reduction Act. The Chief Statistician of the United States, also housed within OMB, provides oversight, coordination, and guidance for Federal statistical activities, working in collaboration with leaders of statistical agencies.

Centralization efforts
To streamline operations and reduce costs, several proposals have been made to consolidate the federal statistical system into fewer agencies, or even a single agency. In 2011, President Barack Obama's proposal to reorganize the U.S. Department of Commerce included placing several statistical agencies under one umbrella.

Principal statistical agencies

Statistical units
These are subcomponents of agencies recognized by the OMB as having statistical work as part of their mission:

 Microeconomic Surveys Unit, (Board of Directors of the Federal Reserve System)
 Center for Behavioral Health Statistics and Quality, Substance Abuse and Mental Health Services Administration (Department of Health and Human Services)
 National Animal Health Monitoring System, Animal and Plant Health Inspection Service (Department of Agriculture)

See also
Federal Statistical Research Data Centers

References

External links
Statistical Programs and Standards, U.S. Office of Management and Budget: obamawhitehouse.archives.gov

 
Statistical organizations in the United States
Agencies of the United States government